Sala Fotbollförening is a Swedish professional football club based in Sala, Västmanland County. Founded in 1972, they play in the 12-team Division 3 Norra Svealand in Sweden's fifth tier. They play their home games on public pitches at Sportfältsgatan. Their former home was Silvervallen.

The club has 18 teams across men's senior, men's junior and women's categories.

Sala FF is affiliated with Västmanlands Fotbollförbund.

History
Sala FF was formed in December 1972 after IF Norden and IFK Sala merged.

In 1983, the club won promotion to Division 3 (tier 5) for the first time, but they were relegated the following season after finishing the campaign with 14 straight defeats.

They returned to the fifth tier in 1994, under the managerial guidance of Tommy Carlsson.

They remained in the division, and in 1995 they faced Heby AIF, from the neighbouring town, for the first time in the league. Sala finished the season in fourth; Heby were seventh.

In 1996, Heby finished fifth, one place higher than Sala (then managed by Rolf Stahn).

For the 1997 season, Sala was moved to Division 3 in Södra Norrland. They were relegated under new manager Thomas Johansson.

They later dropped another level, to tier 6, before winning promotion, with manager Tony Mattsson, to the fifth tier in 2012, where they have remained to date.

Season history
2013 – 9th, Division 3 Södra Svealand Svealand (tier 5)
2014 – 2nd, Division 3 Västra Svealand (tier 5)
2015 – 4th, Division 3 Södra Norrland (tier 5)
2016 – 5th, Division 3 Södra Norrland (tier 5)
2017 – 6th, Division 3 Östra Svealand (tier 5)
2018 – 3rd, Division 3 Södra Norrland (tier 5)
2019 – 2nd, Division 3 Södra Norrland (tier 5)
2020 – TBD, Division 3 Norra Svealand (tier 5)

Managerial history
1973: Christer Hemlin

1974: Hans "Norrby-Hasse" Johansson & Hans "Strömstad" Johansson

1975–78: Björn Larsson

1979: Hans “Strömstad” Johansson

1980–83: Hugo Karlsson

1984–86: Björn Larsson

1987–91: Hasse Ljung

1992: Allan Pettersson

1993: Håkan Reuterwall

1994–95: Tommy Carlsson

1996: Rolf Stahn

1997–99: Thomas Johansson

2000: Lars-Inge Johansson & Micke Eriksson

2001: Tommy Carlsson (second term)

2002–04: Håkan Reuterwall

2005: Janne Östlund

2006–07: And Enström

2008: Stefan Thid

2009: Fredrik Dimberg

2010: Pelle Johansson

2011–12: Tony Mattsson

2013–14: Michael Andersson

2015–present: Jens Eriksson

Source

References

External links
 
 Sala FF's page at Sala Allehanda
 Sala FF's page at Fussball Datenbank

Football clubs in Västmanland County
Association football clubs established in 1972
1972 establishments in Sweden
Sport in Västmanland County